Yukhym Hryhorovych Shkolnykov (31 January 1939 – 3 September 2009) was a Ukrainian coach and Soviet footballer. He was on the original squad of Avanhard Chernihiv, that in 1960 joined the Class B competitions.

Playing career
Since 1960 he played for the Chernihiv's Desna (Avanhard at first). In 1965, when he was touring with the Ukraine football national team India, Burma and Thailand (scored 8 goals), he received an invitation from Nikolai Starostin to move to Muscovite "Spartak", but decided to stay in his Chernihiv team.

In 1963 after his return from Zirka Chernihiv, Shkolnikov became a fan's favorite whom the Chernihiv's fans called "Fima, davai" (Fima, let's go).

In 1976 as a coach of amateur Khimik Chernihiv he won the Chernihiv Oblast Football Championship in 1976. The year later, in 1977, Desna Chernihiv was reestablished.

Coaching career
At the end of his playing career he coached the amateur team Khimik Chernihiv, which under his leadership became the Champion of Ukrainian Amateur Football Championship in 1976. In 1977, on the basis of "Chemist" was revived "Desna", in 1982 took second place in the Ukrainian zone of the Second League of the USSR. With Vinnytsia's Niva (1983–1986) he won medals in the Second All-Union League for three seasons in a row.

In 1987–1992 he headed Bukovyna Chernivtsi in 1988 got the first place and in 1989 got second. The team entered won the Soviet Second League in 1990 and was promoted to First League of the USSR and the following season took 5th place. In 1991, after the collapse of the Soviet Union, he was one of the candidates for the position of head coach of the national team of Ukraine.

Honours

As player 
Khimik Chernihiv
 Chernihiv Oblast Football Championship 1969, 1970, 1971

Desna Chernihiv
 Football Championship of the Ukrainian SSR: 1968

FC Zirka Chernihiv
 Chernihiv Oblast Football Championship 1962

As coach 
Desna Chernihiv
Ukrainian Second League: 1996–97Bukovyna ChernivtsiFootball Championship of the Ukrainian SSR: 1988
Soviet Vtoraya Liga: 1990Nyva VinnytsiaUkrainian First League: 1992–93
Championship of the Ukrainian SSR: 1984Khimik Chernihiv'''
 Chernihiv Oblast Football Championship 1976

References

External links
  Died a distinguished coach
  Shkolnykov Yukhym Hryhorovych
 

1939 births
2009 deaths
Footballers from Chernihiv
Soviet footballers
Association football forwards
Soviet First League players
Ukrainian footballers
FC Desna Chernihiv players
FC Khimik Chernihiv players
Ukrainian football managers
Soviet football managers
Soviet First League managers
FC Desna Chernihiv managers
FC CSKA Kyiv managers
FC Bukovyna Chernivtsi managers
FC Nyva Vinnytsia managers
FC Polissya Zhytomyr managers
CS Tiligul-Tiras Tiraspol managers
Ukrainian Premier League managers
Ukrainian expatriate football managers
Expatriate football managers in Moldova
Ukrainian emigrants to the United States